Laura Cordelia Creavalle is a Guyanese-born Canadian/American professional female bodybuilder.

Early life and education
Laura Creavalle was born in 1959 in British Guiana. She migrated to Canada at the age of 13. She attended both Industrial High School and Mercy College.

Bodybuilding career

Amateur
During a 1982 trip to Kingston, Jamaica, Creavalle happened upon a women’s bodybuilding contest and was impressed that the competitor who placed third had a body type similar to hers – a lower body proportionally larger than the upper body.  Upon returning to her home in Toronto, Ontario, she began training to become a bodybuilder. Six months later, she entered her first contest, the Novice Ontario Championships, and won the lightweight title.  In 1983, she and training partner Tony Melville joined poses and took second place at the Canadian Couples Championships. A trip to California further stimulated her interest, which resulted in her relocating.  In 1986, she won the NPC USA Championships. She earned her pro card by winning the heavyweight class at the 1988 IFBB World Amateur Championships in Puerto Rico.

Professional
In 1988, Creavalle made her pro debut six weeks later at the 1988 Ms. Olympia contest, a contest to which she would return 12 more times before her retirement. During her pro career, her home country would appear as both Canada and the United States in the competition scorecard.  She was runner-up twice at the Ms. Olympia (1992, 1994) and won three Ms. International titles (1990, 1994–95).

Retirement
After coming in 6th at the 2002 Ms. Olympia, Creavalle retired from bodybuilding.

Legacy
Creavalle was inducted into the IFBB Hall of Fame in 2007. Currently, she is the most successful bodybuilder of Guyanese descent in the world.

Contest history
1983 Novice Canada - 1st
1983 Toronto Championships - 1st
1983 Ontario Canadian Championships novice - 1st
1985 Toronto Championships - 1st
1985 The Choice of Champions - 1st
1986 NPC Southern California - 1st (HW)
1986 NPC California State - 2nd (HW)
1986 NPC Nationals - 4th (MW)
1986 NPC USA Championship - 1st (LHW and Overall)
1986 NPC USA Mixed Pairs - 1st
1988 IFBB Caribbean Championships - 1st (HW)
1988 IFBB World Amateur Championships - 1st (HW)
1988 IFBB Ms. Olympia - 11th
1989 Pro World - 8th
1989 IFBB Ms. Olympia - 6th
1990 Ms. International - 1st
1990 IFBB Ms. Olympia - 4th
1991 IFBB Ms. Olympia - 3rd
1992 Ms. International - 3rd
1992 IFBB Ms. Olympia - 2nd
1993 IFBB Ms. Olympia - 3rd
1994 Ms. International - 1st
1994 IFBB Ms. Olympia - 2nd
1995 Ms. International - 1st
1995 IFBB Ms. Olympia - 5th
1996 Ms. International - 2nd
1996 IFBB Ms. Olympia - 4th
1997 IFBB Ms. Olympia - 4th
1998 IFBB Ms. Olympia - 5th
1999 Pro Extravaganza - 1st
1999 IFBB Ms. Olympia - 3rd
2002 IFBB Ms. Olympia - 6th (LW)

Personal life
Now retired from competition, she operates Club Creavalle Training Camp, offering personal training, nutrition training, and related services.  She also has written two cook books, A Taste of Club Creavalle and The Lite Lifestyle: 150 Ultra Low Calorie Recipes for Rapid Weight Loss!.  She also co-authored The Health Handbook with former husband Chris Aceto.  Laura has been a feature editor for Muscle & Fitness magazine on low fat cooking in the Muscle Fare column.

She has remarried since December 2000 to Colin Maragh, who both now currently live in Toronto, Ontario, Canada, sells healthy meals through their company, Healthy Gourmet Express, which provides customers with weekly deliveries of 10 meals.

References

External links
Official web site

| colspan = 3 align = center | Ms. International
|-
| width = 30% align = center | Preceded by:Jackie Paisley
| width = 40% align = center | First (1990)
| width = 30% align = center | Succeeded by:Tonya Knight
|-
| width = 30% align = center | Preceded by:Kim Chizevsky-Nicholls
| width = 40% align = center | Second (1994)
| width = 30% align = center | Succeeded by:Herself
|-
| width = 30% align = center | Preceded by:Herself
| width = 40% align = center | Third (1995)
| width = 30% align = center | Succeeded by:Kim Chizevsky-Nicholls

1959 births
Black Canadian sportspeople
Canadian emigrants to the United States
Canadian female bodybuilders
Canadian sportspeople of Guyanese descent
Guyanese emigrants to Canada
Guyanese female bodybuilders
Living people
Mercy College (New York) alumni
People from Dobbs Ferry, New York
People from Jackson County, Texas
People from Old Orchard Beach, Maine
Professional bodybuilders
Sportspeople from California
Sportspeople from Maine
Sportspeople from New York (state)
Sportspeople from Texas
Sportspeople from Toronto
Sportspeople from Westchester County, New York
Afro-Guyanese people
Black Canadian sportswomen